Abiathar Crescas was a 15th-century physician and astrologer from the Crown of Aragon (now part of Spain). He was head astrologer to King John II of Aragon, father of King Ferdinand of Aragon.

He could remove cataracts by a surgical procedure known as couching. In 1468 he restored the eyesight of King John in two simple operations, who was completely blind before the surgeries.

Crescas was a leader of Aragon's Jewish community.

References

 

Philosophers of Judaism
Medieval Jewish physicians of Spain
Medieval Jewish astrologers
15th-century Aragonese Jews
Medieval Jewish philosophers
Spanish philosophers
Year of birth unknown
Year of death unknown
Medieval Spanish astrologers